John Ray Broxson (June 10, 1932 – December 9, 2019) was an American politician who served as a member of the Florida Senate from the 1st district from 1966 to 1972. A member of the Democratic Party, he previously served as the 19th sheriff of Santa Rosa County from 1959 to 1961

Life and career 
Broxson was born in Holley, Florida, the son Bart Dell and Annie Rachel (née Gordon) Broxson. He attended Southwestern Assemblies of God University in Texas and worked in the real estate and insurance business. In December 1959, he was appointed as sheriff of Santa Rosa County by Governor LeRoy Collins to continue the unexpired term of his father, Sheriff Bart Dell Broxson. He was elected to the State Senate in 1966 and served the 1st district until 1971. His brother, Doug Broxson also serves in the Florida House of Representatives.

References

External links

1932 births
2019 deaths
People from Santa Rosa County, Florida
Businesspeople from Florida
Southwestern Assemblies of God University alumni
Florida sheriffs
Democratic Party Florida state senators
20th-century American businesspeople